The Tony Danza Tapdance Extravaganza is the self-titled debut by the American mathcore band The Tony Danza Tapdance Extravaganza.

Background
The Tony Danza Tapdance Extravaganza formed in 2004, releasing a self-titled demo that same year. In 2005, the band was signed to Corrosive Recordings. Corrosive would re-release the band's demo as the group's first studio album, featuring three new songs.

Track listing

Personnel
The Tony Danza Tapdance Extravaganza
Jessie Freeland – vocals
Brad Thompson – guitar
Layne Meylain – guitar
Mike Butler – bass
Mason Crooks – drums

Additional
Neil Dietz – additional vocals on track 1
Jason Dietz – producer, audio engineer
Nicholas Zampiello – mastering

References

2005 debut albums
The Tony Danza Tapdance Extravaganza albums